The Fifteenth Oklahoma Legislature was a meeting of the legislative branch of the government of Oklahoma, composed of the Oklahoma Senate and the Oklahoma House of Representatives. The state legislature met from January 8 to April 30, 1935, during the term of Governor E.W. Marland. Marland influenced the selection of Leon C. Phillips for Speaker of the Oklahoma House of Representatives. Phillips had been an opponent of Governor William H. Murray's proposals. Phillips also opposed many of Marland's proposals.

Dates of session
Regular session: January 8-April 30, 1935
Previous: 14th Legislature • Next: 16th Legislature

Major events
Three state questions related to old age pensions were presented to voters in September 1935. Only State Question 214, which authorized pensions, social security, and a welfare commission, were approved by voters. The Oklahoma Supreme Court ruled State Question 214 was illegal in February 1936.
On July 7, 1936, State Question 225, which established a welfare program, and State Question 226, which created assistance for the aged, blind, crippled children, and dependent children, were approved by voters. 
In August 1936 the Oklahoma Department of Public Welfare was established, which administered the old age assistance program and other welfare programs.

Party composition

Senate

House of Representatives

Leadership

Senate
As Lieutenant Governor of Oklahoma, James E. Berry served as the President of the Senate, serving as the presiding officer in ceremonial instances. President Pro Tempore of the Oklahoma Senate Claud Briggs served as the member-elected leader of the state senate.

House of Representatives
The Oklahoma Democratic Party held 112 of the 120 seats in the Oklahoma House of Representatives in 1935, allowing them to select the Speaker of the Oklahoma House of Representatives. Leon C. Phillips served in the role in 1935 and Merton Munson served as Speaker Pro Tempore.

Members

Senate

Table based on state almanac.

House of Representatives

Table based on government database.

References

External links
Oklahoma Legislature
Oklahoma House of Representatives
Oklahoma Senate

Oklahoma legislative sessions
1935 in Oklahoma
1936 in Oklahoma
1935 U.S. legislative sessions
1936 U.S. legislative sessions